Colette Anna Grégoire (known as Anna Gréki; 14 March 1931 – 6 January 1966) was an Algerian poet of French origin. She married an Algerian, considered herself Algerian, and was involved in the struggle for Algeria's independence from France. Her work shows her love of the Aurès Mountains where she grew up, and her strong political beliefs.

Life
Colette Anna Grégoire was born on 14 March 1931 in Batna, Algeria. She grew up in Menaâ, a small town in the Aurès Mountains, in a Chaoui Berber community.
She was from a third-generation French family in Algeria, and was the only child of a family of progressive teachers who were very integrated into the Muslim culture.
Her father taught elementary school.
She became very conscious of the discrimination and injustice of the colonial system.
As an adolescent she was extremely poor, but was helped by the community.

Colette Grégoire attended university in Paris, but returned to Algeria before graduating to assist in the struggle for independence.
She joined the Parti Communiste Algérien (PCA).
In 1955 she was a communist at a time when the communist party was banned.
She always also fought for equal rights for women.
Grégoire was arrested in April 1957 and imprisoned in Algiers at the Barberousse prison.
Women here were beaten, abused and tortured with water and electricity.
She was sent to an internment camp, and in 1958 was deported, probably because of her French origins.

Colette Grégoire married in 1960.
Her husband was an Algerian named Melki. Her pen-name Anna Gréki is formed from their two last names.
After independence in 1962 Colette Grégoire returned to Algeria.
In 1963 she was one of the few Europeans to point out the discrimination in the law of 1963 which said that both parents should be from a paternal line born in Algeria and should be Muslim.
In 1965 she obtained her BA in French Literature and became a high school teacher in Algiers.
She taught in the Lycée Abdelkader.
Colette Grégoire died on 6 January 1966 during childbirth, at the age of 34.

Work
Anna Gréki's poetry reflects her love of her native land, the Aurès, and her political beliefs.
She wrote of her native country,

Anna Gréki's poetry was among the best to be produced during the Algerian war of independence.
She praised the women who had the courage to join the struggle for freedom, and was optimistic about the future.
She did not stress the trouble she experienced in prison, but tried to raise the morale of other women.
She wrote, 

And again,

Anna Gréki published one volume of poetry during her lifetime, Algérie capitale Alger, published in 1963 in Tunisia.
The preface to this work was written by Mostefa Lacheraf.
Other works, published posthumously, are:
Éléments pour un art nouveau (with Mohammed Khadda) Galerie Pilote (Edmond Charlot), Algiers, 1966.
Temps forts, Présence africaine, Paris, 1966.
Théories, prétextes et réalités in Présence Africaine, n°58, 1966.

References

Sources

1931 births
1966 deaths
20th-century French poets
French women poets
20th-century Algerian poets
People from Batna, Algeria
Algerian women writers
Algerian writers
Algerian women's rights activists
Algerian communists
Algerian women poets
20th-century French women writers